Mabo v Queensland (No 2) (commonly known as the Mabo case or simply Mabo) is a landmark decision of the High Court of Australia that recognised the existence of Native Title in Australia. It was brought by Eddie Mabo against the State of Queensland and decided on 3 June 1992. The case is notable for being the first in Australia to recognise pre-colonial land interests of Indigenous Australians within the common law of Australia.

Mabo is of great legal, historical, and political importance to Aboriginal and Torres Strait Islander Australians. The decision rejected the notion that Australia was terra nullius (i.e. owned by no one) at the time of British settlement, and recognised that Indigenous rights to land existed by virtue of traditional customs and laws and these rights had not been wholly lost upon colonisation.

The Prime Minister Paul Keating during his Redfern speech praised the decision, saying saying it "establishes a fundamental truth, and lays the basis for justice". Conversely, the decision was criticised by the government of Western Australia and various mining and pastoralist groups.

Soon after the decision, the Keating Government passed the Native Title Act 1993 (Cth), which codified the rights recognised in Mabo and set out a new process for applicants to have their rights recognised through the newly established Native Title Tribunal and the Federal Court of Australia.

Background

History of Mer
The case centred on the Murray Islands Group, consisting of Murray Island (known traditionally as Mer Island), Waua Islet and Daua Island. The islands have been inhabited by the Meriam people (a group of Torres Strait Islanders) for between 300 and 2000 years.

Prior to and after annexation by the British, rights to land on Mer is governed by Malo's Law, "a set of religiously sanctioned laws which Merriam people feel bound to observe". Under this law, the entirety of Mer is owned by different Meriam land owners and there is no concept of public ownership. Land is owned by the eldest son on behalf of a particular lineage or family so that land is jointly owned individually and communally.  Unlike western law, title to land is orally based, although there is also a written tradition introduced to comply with State and Commonwealth inheritance and welfare laws. However, ownership is not 'one way' under this system of law, and an individual both owns the land and is owned by it. As such, they have the responsibility to care and share it with their clan or family and maintain it for future generations. 

In 1871 missionaries from the London Missionary Society arrived on the Torres Strait island of Darnley Island in an event known as "The coming of the Light" leading to the conversion to Christianity of much of the Torres Strait, including Mer Island. This however did not lead to a replacement of traditional native traditions, but a synthesis with traditional customs including the Malo's Law being recognised within the framework of Christianity. Reverend David Passi, who gave evidence in the trial, explained that he believed that God had sent Malo to Mer island and that "Jesus Christ was where Malo was pointing."

In 1879 the islands were formally annexed by the State of Queensland.

By the 1900s, the traditional economic life of the Torres Strait gave way to wage labouring on fishing boats mostly owned by others. In the aftermath of the great depression and an subsequent cut in wages, Islanders in 1936 joined a strike instigated by Mer Islanders. This strike was the first organised Islander challenge to western authorities since colonisation.

Legal Background
Prior to Mabo, the pre-colonial property interests of Indigenous Australians were not recognised by the Australian legal system. Litigation over this issue directly did not arise until the 1970s with the case of Milirrpum v Nabalco Pty Ltd. In that case, native title was held to not exist and to never have existed in Australia.

Later in 1982, the plaintiffs, headed by Eddie Mabo, requested a declaration from the High Court that the Meriam people were entitled to property rights on Murray Island according to their local customs, original native ownership and their actual use and possession of the land. The State of Queensland was the respondent to the proceeding and argued that native title rights had never existed in Australia and even if it did they had been removed due to (at the latest) the passage of the Land Act 1910 (Qld).

Prior to judgment, the Queensland government passed the Queensland Coast Islands Declaratory Act 1985 (Qld), which purported to extinguish the native title on the Murray Islands that Mabo and the other plaintiffs were seeking to claim. This was successfully challenged in Mabo v Queensland (1988) 166 CLR 186 (Mabo No 1) and declared as ineffective due to the act being inconsistent with the right to equality before the law, as established by the Racial Discrimination Act 1975 (Cth).

Judgment
The court held that rights arising under native title were recognised within Australia's common law. These rights were sourced from Indigenous laws and customs and not from a grant from the Crown. However, these rights were not absolute and may be extinguished by validly enacted State or Commonwealth legislation or grants of land rights inconsistent with native title rights. Additionally, the acquisition of radical title to land by the Crown at British settlement did not by itself extinguish native title interests.

A majority of the High Court found that:

 The doctrine of terra nullius was not applicable to Australia at the time of British settlement of New South Wales
 The Crown acquires radical title to land when it acquires sovereignty over it
 Native title exists as part of the common law of Australia
 The source of native title was the traditional customs and laws of Indigenous groups
 The nature and content of native title rights depended upon ongoing traditional laws and customs
 Native title could be extinguished by a valid exercise of government power that was inconsistent with an ongoing native title interest.

Terra nullius 
Various members of the court discussed the international law doctrine of terra nullius (no one's land), meaning uninhabited or inhabited territory which is not under the jurisdiction of a state, and which can be acquired by a state through occupation. The court also discussed the analogous common law doctrine that "desert and uncultivated land" which includes land "without settled inhabitants or settled law" can be acquired by Britain by settlement, and that the laws of England are transmitted at settlement. A majority of the court rejected the notion that the doctrine of terra nullius precluded the common law recognition of traditional Indigenous rights and interests in land at the time of British settlement of New South Wales.

Significance
The case attracted widespread controversy and public debate. Paul Keating, Prime Minister of Australia at the time, praised the decision in his Redfern Speech, saying that it "establishes a fundamental truth, and lays the basis for justice". Richard Court, the Premier of Western Australia, voiced opposition to the decision in comments echoed by various mining and pastoralist interest groups.

Development of native title

The decision led to the legal doctrine of native title, enabling further litigation for First Nations land rights. Native title doctrine was eventually codified in statute by the Keating Government in the Native Title Act 1993 (Cth).

The recognition of native title by the decision gave rise to many significant legal questions. These included questions as to the validity of titles issued which were subject to the Racial Discrimination Act 1975 (Cth), the permissibility of future development of land affected by native title, and procedures for determining whether native title existed in land.

In response to the judgment the Keating Government enacted the Native Title Act 1993 (Cth), which established the National Native Title Tribunal to hear native title claims at first instance. The act was subsequently amended by the Howard Government in response to the Wik decision.

Legal test for First Nations identity
Within his judgment, Justice Brennan stated a three part legal test for recognition of a person's identity as a First Nations Australian. He wrote:'Membership of the Indigenous people depends on biological descent from the Indigenous people and on mutual recognition of a particular person's membership by that person and by the elders or other persons enjoying traditional authority among those people'This test has been used in later cases to establish whether or not a person is Indigenous.

Aftermath 
Ten years following the Mabo decision, his wife Bonita Mabo claimed that issues remained within the community about land on Mer.

An Indigenous land use agreement was signed on 7 July 2014.

Legacy 

Mabo Day is an official holiday in the Torres Shire, celebrated on 3 June, and occurs during National Reconciliation Week in Australia.

The case was referenced in the 1997 comedy The Castle, as an icon of legal rightness, embodied in the quote "In summing up, it’s the Constitution, it’s Mabo, it’s justice, it’s law, it’s the vibe".

In 2009 as part of the Q150 celebrations, the Mabo High Court of Australia decision was announced as one of the Q150 Icons of Queensland for its role as a "Defining Moment".

A straight-to-TV film titled Mabo was produced in 2012 by Blackfella Films in association with the ABC and SBS. It provided a dramatised account of the case, focusing on the effect it had on Mabo and his family.

See also

 Native title in Australia
 Aboriginal title
 Indigenous land rights in Australia
 History of Indigenous Australians
 List of Australian Native Title court cases
 Love v Commonwealth
 Milirrpum v Nabalco Pty Ltd
 Mabo v Queensland (No 1)
 Native Title Act 1993
 Wik Peoples v Queensland
 Yorta Yorta v Victoria
 Land tenure
 Allodial title

Notes

References

Richard Bartlett, "The Proprietary Nature of Native Title" (1998) 6 Australian Property Law Journal 1

Further reading

Papers of Edward Koiki Mabo, held by the National Library of Australia
A film about the case.

Hi, I'm Eddie - Podcast by the State Library of Queensland. Winner 2021 Best Indigenous podcast, Australian Podcast Awards.

External links 

 Album of Photographs Relating to the Mabo Case on Mer Island 1989, State Library of Queensland

Native title case law in Australia
High Court of Australia cases
1992 in Australian law
Torres Strait Islands culture
1992 in case law
Keating Government